Jenni Pauliina Banerjee (born 17 January 1981 in Ylöjärvi, Finland) is a Finnish actress with Indian ancestry. She has appeared in movies such as Pahat pojat (2003), Joensuun Elli (2004) and Lieksa! (2007). Her maternal grandfather is from Calcutta, India.

Selected filmography
Luokkajuhla (2002)
Pahat pojat (2003)
Hymypoika (2003)
Joensuun Elli (2004)
Käenpesä (2004) (one episode)
Caasha (2005)
Unna ja Nuuk (2006)
Lieksa! (2007)
Blackout (2008)
Kohtaamisia (2009)
Harjunpää ja pahan pappi (2010)
Salatut elämät (2014)

References

External links

1981 births
Living people
People from Ylöjärvi
Finnish people of Indian descent
Finnish actresses